Rough Winds is a 2006 Spanish melodrama film directed by Gerardo Herrero adapting the novel Los aires difíciles by Almudena Grandes. It features José Luis García Pérez, Cuca Escribano and Carmen Elías.

Plot 
After surviving a shipwreck, Juan Olmedo seeks solace and redress together with his brother Alfonso (a mentally handicapped person) and his niece Tamara in an Andalusian village in the Atlantic coast of the province of Cádiz, seeking to overcome the death of Charo (Juan's child love, wife of his brother Damián, and Juan's lover) in a traffic collision. He develops a bond and sexual relationship with the maid, the lively Maribel, while Panrico (Maribel's former partner) and Sara (Juan's neighbor and Maribel's friend) stay aloof.

Cast

Production 
An adaptation of the novel Los vientos difíciles by Almudena Grandes, the screenplay was penned by Ángeles González-Sinde and Alberto Macías. The film is a Tornasol Films, Continental Producciones and Maestranza Films production. Shooting locations included Zahara de los Atunes, Barbate and Madrid.

Release 
The film was presented at the 9th Málaga Film Festival, screened as part of the festival's main competition. Distributed by Alta Classics, the film was theatrically released in Spain on 24 March 2006.

Reception 
Fernando Méndez-Leite of Fotogramas scored a 4 out 5 stars rating, underscoring Rough Winds to be a film "for fans of character-driven and sentimental films", drawing out the design and the performance by Carmen Elías as the best thing about the film.

Jonathan Holland of Variety presented the film as "skillfully-handled but—given its subject—passionless drama", dragged by a "bland" performance by José Luis García Pérez, otherwise highlighting Cuca Escribano's as the standout performance.

Accolades 

|-
| align = "center" | 2006 || colspan = "2" | 9th Málaga Film Festival || Golden Biznaga for Best Film ||  || align = "center" | 
|}

See also 
 List of Spanish films of 2006

References

External links 

2006 drama films
2006 films
2000s Spanish-language films
Spanish drama films
Films directed by Gerardo Herrero
Films shot in the province of Cádiz
Films shot in Madrid
Films based on Spanish novels
Films set in Andalusia
Tornasol Films films
Maestranza Films films
2000s Spanish films